Zonosemata electa is a species of tephritid or fruit flies in the genus Zonosemata of the family Tephritidae.

References

Trypetinae